The 7th Mechanized Division is a division of the Syrian Arab Army, currently engaged in the Syrian Civil War.

History
The division, formed as 7th Infantry Division, was a key component of the Syrian attack force in the 1973 Yom Kippur War, involved in some of the heaviest fighting in the Golan Heights, especially in the aptly named 'Valley of Tears'.  The division, with its attached armoured brigade, lost a great number of tanks when trying on many accounts to rush the Israeli defenses. Omar Abrash was serving as the division commander.

Although Syrian division had a nominal strength of around 10,000 men, 200 tanks, 72 artillery pieces and similar numbers of SAMs and anti-aircraft guns, the 7th Infantry Division had only 80% of its tanks and APCs during the war. Furthermore, although designated as an infantry division, the division was essentially mechanised.

In 1973, the division's equipment, organisation, tactics, and training were virtually identical to those of the 5th Infantry Division during its action in Jordan.

Because of the extensive losses suffered by the division during the battle of the Valley of Tears, one of the division's brigades had to be pulled out of action for 3 days before being reorganized as a battalion.

In August 2012, Mohamed Moussa al-Khairat, reported as the division commander, defected to Jordan.

References

Divisions of Syria
Infantry divisions